Baxter Estates is a village in Nassau County, on the North Shore of Long Island, in New York, United States. It is considered part of the Greater Port Washington area, which is anchored by Port Washington. The population was 999 at the 2010 census.

The Incorporated Village of Baxter Estates is located on the Cow Neck Peninsula, within the Town of North Hempstead, and is recognized as a Tree City USA.

History
The Village of Baxter Estates was incorporated in 1931. Baxter Estates owes much of its history to the homestead settlement of "Cow Neck" built in 1673 by John Betts and Robert Hutchings, which still stands on its original site at the corner of Central Drive and Shore Road, overlooking Manhasset Bay. This property was purchased around 1741 by Oliver Baxter, and maps of the time show that an entire wigwam village, belonging to the Matinecock Indians, may have been located on Baxter's land.

The Baxters, who were shipbuilders, whalers and sea captains, retained the property until the 19th century. Hessian troops were quartered in the Baxter House during the Revolutionary War, and in 1895 the first library of Port Washington met in the parlor of the Baxter house. The residence was designated as a historic building. The owner, Sabrina Wu, was in the process of submitting plans to demolish the landmarked home when a massive blaze broke out, heavily damaging the home on February 5, 2017. The cause of the fire was not determined.

The village is named for the Baxter family, which owned a significant amount of land in the area.

Geography

Baxter Estates is located within the Manhasset Bay Watershed, which in turn is located within the larger Long Island Sound/Atlantic Ocean Watershed.

Demographics

2010 census 
As of the census of 2010, there were 999 people residing in the village. The racial makeup of the village was 81.08% White, 1.30% African American, 6.01% Asian, 3.50% from other races, and 7.61% from two or more races. Hispanic or Latino of any race were 16.82% of the population.

Census 2000 
As of the census of 2000, there were 1,006 people, 376 households, and 262 families residing in the village. The population density was 5,574.4 people per square mile (2,157.9/km2). There were 386 housing units at an average density of 2,138.9 per square mile (828.0/km2). The racial makeup of the village was 84.00% White, 2.68% African American, 0.10% Native American, 7.16% Asian, 3.98% from other races, and 2.09% from two or more races. Hispanic or Latino of any race were 14.61% of the population.

There were 376 households, out of which 36.4% had children under the age of 18 living with them, 57.2% were married couples living together, 8.5% had a female householder with no husband present, and 30.1% were non-families. 25.3% of all households were made up of individuals, and 10.9% had someone living alone who was 65 years of age or older. The average household size was 2.68 and the average family size was 3.21.

In the village, the population was spread out, with 24.8% under the age of 18, 6.2% from 18 to 24, 29.0% from 25 to 44, 27.1% from 45 to 64, and 12.9% who were 65 years of age or older. The median age was 39 years. For every 100 females, there were 99.2 males. For every 100 females age 18 and over, there were 95.6 males.

The median income for a household in the village was $84,592, and the median income for a family was $111,074. Males had a median income of $56,250 versus $51,250 for females. The per capita income for the village was $44,718. About 3.0% of families and 4.7% of the population were below the poverty line, including 5.0% of those under age 18 and 6.3% of those age 65 or over.

Government

Village government 
As of August 2021, the Mayor of Baxter Estates is Nora Haagenson, the Deputy Mayor is Charles Comer, and the Village Trustees are Charles Comer, Chris Ficalora, Alice M. Peckelis, and Brian Reardon.

Representation in higher government

Town representation 
Baxter Estates is located in the Town of North Hempstead's 6th district, which as of September 2021 is represented on the Town Board by Mariann Dalimonte (D – Port Washington).

Nassau County representation 
Baxter Estates is located in Nassau County's 11th Legislative district, which as of September 2021 is represented in the Nassau County Legislature by Delia DiRiggi-Whitton (D–Glen Cove).

New York State representation

New York State Assembly 
Baxter Estates is located within the New York State Assembly's 16th Assembly district, which as of September 2021 is represented by Gina Sillitti (D–Manorhaven).

New York State Senate 
Baxter Estates is located in the New York State Senate's 7th State Senate district, which as of January 2023 is represented in the New York State Senate by Jack Martins (R-Great Neck).

Federal representation

United States Congress 
Baxter Estates is located in New York's 3rd congressional district, which as of September 2021 is represented in the United States Congress by Tom Suozzi (D–Glen Cove).

United States Senate 
Like the rest of New York, Baxter Estates is represented in the United States Senate by Charles Schumer (D) and Kirsten Gillibrand (D).

Politics 
In the 2016 U.S. presidential election, the majority of Baxter Estates voters voted for Hillary Clinton (D).

Education

School district 
The Village of Baxter Estates is located entirely within the boundaries of the Port Washington Union Free School District. As such, all children who reside within Baxter Estates and attend public schools go to Port Washington's schools.

Library district 

Baxter Estates is located within the boundaries of the Port Washington Library District.

Additionally, the Port Washington Public Library is located within Baxter Estates.

Notable people 

 Jean Ritchie – folk singer; lived on Locust Avenue.
 George Pickow – photographer; Jean Ritchie's husband.

See also 

 List of Tree Cities USA

References

External links

 Official website

Town of North Hempstead, New York
Villages in New York (state)
Villages in Nassau County, New York
Populated coastal places in New York (state)